Liu Heng-ching (8 March 1900 – 8 August 1979) was a Chinese politician. She was among the first group of women elected to the Legislative Yuan in 1948.

Biography
Returning to China, she worked as headmistress of Jiangsu Provincial Nanjing Girls' High School and taught at Chongqing Private Rural Construction College.

Liu became a member of the Kuomintang and served on its central supervisory committee. In the 1948 elections to the Legislative Yuan, she ran as a Kuomintang candidate in Nanjing and was elected to parliament. She relocated to Taiwan during the Chinese Civil War, where she remained a member of the Legislative Yuan until her death in 1979.

References

1900 births
Teachers College, Columbia University alumni
Chinese schoolteachers
20th-century Chinese women politicians
Members of the 1st Legislative Yuan
Members of the 1st Legislative Yuan in Taiwan
1979 deaths
Kuomintang Members of the Legislative Yuan in Taiwan
20th-century Taiwanese women politicians